Gary Pine, also Gary "Nesta" Pine, is a Jamaican singer best known for the vocals on several Bob Sinclar songs, including "Love Generation", "Shining from Heaven", "Miss Me", "Give a Lil' Love", and "Sound of Freedom". He was the frontman of The Wailers Band from 1998 to 2006 (he shares the mic with Marcia Griffiths on the Live in Jamaica album, among others).

Discography
 1995 - "Dem Wouldn't Live" (single)
 2006 - New Day Ryzin''' (EP)
 2012 - From Jahmaica to de World (album)
 2016 - Revelations'' (album)
 2018 - "One Love" (featuring Alessio Pras) (single)

References

External links

Jamaican male singers
Year of birth missing (living people)
Living people
Easy Star Records artists